Swapner Din (English: Chased by Dreams, translation: A Day of Dreams) is a 2004 Bengali drama film directed and written by Buddhadev Dasgupta, who won the National Film Award for Best Direction for it.

Plot

Paresh (Prosenjit Chatterjee), the protagonist in Swapner Din, cannot afford the luxury of reaching out for the unexplored. For him, travelling in an official jeep across the state is a matter of keeping alive, a business he is forced to do. He screens badly put together family planning films in villages that fall along his predetermined route, often meeting with unpleasant responses from his target audience. His faith in life is sustained by his love for his dream girl — a beautiful actress he saw crying away in a film five years ago and has been haunted by. He has never met her. She accompanies him on his daily sojourns through a sticker of her picture pasted on the projector box he carries along.

Chapal (Rajesh Sharma), the proxy-driver Paresh is saddled with, carries a stolen passport that has his picture under a different name. His dream is to reach Dubai and land a cushy job to end what he thinks is an apology for living. The pregnant and pretty Amina (Rimi Sen) is running back to her homeland Bangladesh. Her husband, an illegal immigrant, was killed in the Gujarat riots. Her dream is to give birth to her child in her own country, as a legal citizen rooted to his land.

Along the journey, the three share their food, their sleep and their dreams trying to help each other get that much closer to the fulfillment of their respective dreams. No one falls in love, no one attempts to molest Amina, not even the goons who take away the jeep at gun-point and leave them in the wilderness of nowhere, and no one comes to their rescue when their lives, along with their dreams, are threatened by the real danger of death.

Cast

Prasenjit Chatterjee as Paresh
Rimi Sen as Ameena
Rajesh Sharma as Chapal
Raima Sen

Awards

2005 National Film Awards for Best Direction

External links
 

2004 films
Bengali-language Indian films
2004 drama films
Films directed by Buddhadeb Dasgupta
Films whose director won the Best Director National Film Award
2000s Bengali-language films
Indian drama films